The Gulf Oil Company Filling Station is a historic automotive service station building at 131 Main Street in Stamps, Arkansas.  It is a single-story brick building, with a portico, supported by brick piers, extending over the area where the fuel pumps were originally located.  The portico extends from the portion of the building housing what originally served as the station office, with two automotive service bays to its right.  The station was built about 1930, to a corporate design introduced by Gulf Oil in the 1910s, and is painted in that company's colors: white, blue, and orange.

The building was listed on the National Register of Historic Places in 2019.

See also
List of historic filling stations in Arkansas
National Register of Historic Places listings in Lafayette County, Arkansas

References

Gas stations on the National Register of Historic Places in Arkansas
Buildings and structures completed in 1930
National Register of Historic Places in Lafayette County, Arkansas